Anthony Chuang (born 11 December 1944) is a Hong Kong sports shooter. He competed in the mixed skeet event at the 1984 Summer Olympics.

References

External links
 

1944 births
Living people
Hong Kong male sport shooters
Olympic shooters of Hong Kong
Shooters at the 1984 Summer Olympics
Place of birth missing (living people)